Michalis Giannakidis (alternate spellings: Michail, Mihalis) (Greek: Μιχάλης Γιαννακίδης; born April 6, 1988) is a Greek professional basketball player and current basketball executive. During his club playing career, at a height of is 1.92 m (6'3 ") tall, he played at the shooting guard position.

Professional career
Giannakidis began his professional club career in the Greek Second Division with MENT, during the 2006–07 season. He moved to the Greek First Division club PAOK, before the 2008–09 season. In 2012, he moved to the Greek club Ikaros, where he played in 27 games. In 2013, he joined the Greek club Trikala Aries.

In 2014, he moved to the Greek club Koroivos, and in October 2015, he moved to the Greek club Kavala. He finished his playing career with the Greek clubs Iraklis and Agrinio. He retired from playing pro club basketball in 2020.

National team career
With Greece's junior national teams, Giannakidis played at the following tournaments: the 2004 FIBA Europe Under-16 Championship, the 2005 FIBA Europe Under-18 Championship, the 2006 FIBA Europe Under-18 Championship, the 2007 FIBA Europe Under-20 Championship, and the 2008 FIBA Europe Under-20 Championship.

Managerial career
After he ended his basketball playing career, Giannakis began working as a basketball executive. He became the Team Manager of the Greek club PAOK Thessaloniki, in 2020.

References

External links
EuroCup Profile
Eurobasket.com Profile
Draftexpress.com Profile
Greek Basket League Profile 

1988 births
Living people
Aries Trikala B.C. players
Greek men's basketball players
Greek Basket League players
Greek basketball executives and administrators
Ikaros B.C. players
Kavala B.C. players
Koroivos B.C. players
Iraklis Thessaloniki B.C. players
MENT B.C. players
P.A.O.K. BC players
Shooting guards
Basketball players from Thessaloniki